The 2019–20 Eredivisie Vrouwen is the tenth season of the Netherlands women's professional football league. The season takes place from 23 August 2019 to 22 May 2020 with eight teams. Twente started the season as defending champions.

Effects of the COVID-19 pandemic 
On 12 March 2020, all football leagues were suspended until 31 March as the Dutch government forbade events due to the COVID-19 pandemic in the Netherlands. On 15 March this period was extended until 6 April. Due to the decision of the Dutch government to forbid all gatherings and events until 1 June 2020, this period was even further extended.

The Dutch government announced on 21 April that all events subject to authorization, would remain forbidden at least until 1 September 2020. As a result, the KNVB announced the same day, the intention not to continue all remaining suspended competitions. A final decision would be taken after consultation with the UEFA and next the consequences would be discussed with the clubs involved.

On 24 April 2020 the season was cancelled.

Format 
At the regular season, the eight teams play each other twice (once at home and once away), for a total of 14 matches each. After that the top four teams qualify for a championship play-off and the bottom four teams play a placement play-off. In each play-off, teams played each other twice for a total of 6 matches each. Points accumulated at the regular season are halved and added to the points of the play-off stage rounds. There is no relegation nor promotion in the league and the champion and runner-up qualify for the 2020–21 UEFA Women's Champions League.

Teams 

>> As the competition was cancelled, below is the situation on 25 February 2020, the date the last matches were played. <<

Regular season

Standings

Fixtures/results

References

External links 
 Official website
 Season on soccerway.com

Eredivisie (women) seasons
Netherlands
2019–20 in Dutch women's football
Eredivisie (women)